Étude Op. 25, No. 10, in B minor is a solo piano study composed by Frédéric Chopin in 1835.

Structure 
Étude Op. 25, No. 10 features many unique aspects not typically present in Chopin's études, including a significant and distinctive ternary form. The first theme is presented as a series of eighth note-tuplets in cut time, but not in  time, played at a very fast tempo of Allegro. The second theme is in B minor's parallel major, B major, and in triple metre. The second theme is repeated four times, and develops into a variation of the first theme, returning to cut time and B minor.

Copious pedal point notes and phrase markings are present in the second theme, but the entire étude lacks any pedal indications. Similar to the Op. 10, No. 4 étude, Chopin emphasizes legato playing through the phrasing and (lack of) pedal marking. Throughout the entire work, Chopin marks only five dynamic markings; the entire first theme is to be played forte to fortissimo, and the whole second theme is piano.

Notes

External links 

 
 Op. 25, No. 10 played by Josef Lhévinne 
 Op. 25, No. 10 played by Alfred Cortot
 Op. 25, No. 10 played by Claudio Arrau
 Op. 25, No. 10 played by Vladimir Ashkenazy
 Op. 25, No. 10 played by Maurizio Pollini
 Op. 25, No. 10 played by Andrei Gavrilov

25 10
1835 compositions
Compositions in B minor